Voices is the debut album by English soul singer Kenny Thomas, released in 1991. It features the hit singles "Thinking About Your Love", "The Best of You", "Outstanding" and "Tender Love", all of which reached the UK top 40. The album reached No. 3 on the UK Albums Chart.

Background 
Thomas was signed to Cooltempo Records in 1990, releasing a cover of the Gap Band's "Outstanding" as the first single from the album. Produced by Glen Gunner, the song entered the UK Singles Chart and eventually peaked at No. 12 when re-released in early 1991. A few months later, the singer scored his biggest hit with "Thinking About Your Love" which reached No. 4 and remained on the charts for three months. Unlike the rest of the songs on the album, this was produced by ex-Dead or Alive members Tim Lever and Mike Percy.  A third single, "Best of You" (another top 20 hit) heralded the release of Voices in October 1991. The album peaked at No. 3 on the UK Albums Chart and was certified platinum a month later for sales of over 300,000. A fourth and final single, "Tender Love" was released in the run up to Christmas, peaking at No. 26. The album also reached the charts in New Zealand, where Thomas had scored a top 10 hit with "Outstanding", peaking at No. 45.

In February 1992, Thomas scored two BRIT nominations for Best British Male Singer and Best Newcomer. Thomas followed-up Voices two years later with Wait for Me, which although went top 10, fell short of the high sales set by his debut.

Track listing 
 "Outstanding" (Raymond Calhoun) – 4:33
 "Best of You" (Booker T Jones) – 3:44
 "Tender Love" (Jimmy Jam and Terry Lewis) – 4:06
 "Were We Ever in Love" (Ian Green, Kenny Thomas) – 3:55
 "Something Special" (Stevens, Brown, Shavari) – 4:45
 "If You Believe" (David Frank, Tony Fenelle, Tracey Amos) – 4:30
 "Will I Ever See Your Face" (Ian Green, Kenny Thomas) – 5:02
 "Thinking About Your Love" (Jim Williams, Michael Ward, Shaun Ward) – 4:54
 "Voices" (Ian Green, Kenny Nicholas, Kenny Thomas, Trevor Jacobs) – 4:19
 "Girlfriend" (Bert Price, Horace Scott) – 4:41
 "Will I Ever See Your Face" (reprise) (Ian Green, Kenny Thomas) – 0:53
CD bonus track
12. "Best of You" (Touchdown Mix) (Booker T Jones) – 6:02

Personnel 
Adapted from AllMusic.

 Tracy Ackerman – background vocals
 Steve Davies – engineer
 Simon Dunmore – additional production, remixing 
 Richie Fermie – drum programming, keyboard programming
 Claudia Fontaine – background vocals
 Simon Fowler – photography
 Vinney Gee – drums 
 Chyna Gordon – background vocals
 Ian Green – guitar, keyboard programming, MIDI bass, background vocals
 Glen Gunner – producer 
 Janice Hoyte – background vocals
 Trevor Jacobs – background vocals
 Carol Leeming – background vocals
 Tim Lever – drum programming, keyboard programming, producer 
 John Lyons – engineer 
 Deborah Miller – background vocals
 Kenny Nicholas – background vocals
 Mike Percy – drum programming, keyboard programming, producer 
 Kevin Reynolds – saxophone 
 Sonya Roche – background vocals
 Shovel – percussion 
 Kenny Thomas – keyboards, primary artist, vocals, background vocals

References

1991 debut albums
Cooltempo Records albums
Kenny Thomas (singer) albums